Ronald Thomas Villone, Jr. (born January 16, 1970) is a former Major League Baseball (MLB) left-handed relief pitcher and current minor league coach. Villone played for 12 teams in his career, tied for 3rd all time with pitcher Mike Morgan and outfielder Matt Stairs, and trailing only Octavio Dotel and Edwin Jackson.

College career
Born in Englewood, New Jersey, Villone grew up in Bergenfield, New Jersey. He attended the University of Massachusetts Amherst and was a two-sport star, playing baseball and football. Villone was a tight end when he played football, and he had success with it. In 1990, he was selected as a first team All-Yankee Conference tight end.

His natural strength was on the pitcher's mound. In 1991, Villone was the recipient of the Atlantic-10 Left Handed Pitcher of the Year award. Not only did he pitch for Team USA in 1992 at the Barcelona Olympics, he also was a third-team All American Selection after striking out 89 in just 59 innings.

Professional career

Seattle Mariners
Villone was drafted by the Seattle Mariners in the first round (14th overall) of the 1992 Major League Baseball Draft. Prior to signing with Seattle, Villone increased his bargaining position while playing for the Bourne Braves of the Cape Cod Baseball League. He had an impressive debut, striking out 18, and in his next outing, he fanned 14.

In , the Mariners assigned him to Riverside, at the time; it was the Advanced-A affiliate. He posted respectable numbers, going 7–4 with a 4.21 ERA in 16 starts. He pitched 83 innings, allowing 74 hits, walking 62, and striking out 82. These numbers were so good that he earned a promotion to their AA affiliate, Jacksonville. At Jacksonville, he went 3–4 with a 4.38 earned run average in 11 starts. In 63 innings, Villone allowed a total of 49 hits, 41 walks, and 66 strikeouts. Meanwhile, his walks per nine decreased in Jacksonville, as well as his walks and hits allowed per innings pitched. However, his strikeouts per nine innings pitched increased to 9.33, averaging more than one strikeout per inning.

Ron stayed in Jacksonville for the  season, going 6–7 with a 3.86 earned run average. In 41 games, (only five of them were starts); he pitched 79 innings, allowing just 56 hits, 19 walks, and 43 strikeouts. Although he was not the full-time closer, Villone compiled eight saves in the 1994 season.

Because of his stellar 1994 campaign, Seattle promoted him, effective at the start of the  season, to their AAA affiliate, Tacoma (still their affiliate today). He had a magnificent start to the 1995 season, going 1–0 with a 0.61 earned run average. In 22 appearances as the full-time closer, Villone saved 13 games and struck out 43 batters.

Villone was recalled from AAA on April 28, 1995. He made his Major League debut on April 28, 1995 working a scoreless ninth inning against the Detroit Tigers. During that inning he stuck out Travis Fryman of the Tigers for his first career strikeouts.

He posted an 0–2 record with a 7.91 earned run average in 19 games for the Mariners. He walked 23 batters, but struck out 26. He was a victim of the long ball, allowing six home runs.

San Diego Padres
On July 31, 1995, the Mariners General Manager at the time, Woody Woodward, dealt Villone and Marc Newfield to San Diego in exchange for Greg Keagle and Andy Benes. Villone spent the remainder of the season with the Padres, going 2–1 with a 4.21 earned run average. In 25 innings, Villone gave up 24 hits, 11 walks while striking out 37.

He started the  season with San Diego’s AAA Affiliate, Las Vegas. Villone proved that he could be dominant, so, San Diego called him up. He was just as good with the Padres, going 1–1 in 21 games with a 2.95 earned run average. He pitched 18 innings, recording 17 hits, 7 walks, and 19 strikeouts.

Milwaukee Brewers
On July 31, 1996, the Padres shipped Villone, Bryce Florie, and Marc Newfield to the Milwaukee Brewers for Gerald Parent and Greg Vaughn. Despite the trade, Villone still had success in Milwaukee, pitching 24 innings (23 games), allowing 14 hits, 18 walks, and 9 earned runs (3.28 earned run average).

Ron Villone stayed in the majors for the entire  campaign. He pitched another season for the Brewers, going 1–0 with a 3.42 earned run average. His workload increased, as he pitched in 50 games (52 innings), giving up 54 hits, and 36 walks. For the second straight year, Villone averaged less than one strikeout per inning pitched. (In 1997, he fanned 40 in 52 innings)

Cleveland Indians
On December 8, 1997, he was forced to pack his bags, once again, as Milwaukee traded him, Ben McDonald, and Mike Fetters to Cleveland. As part of the deal, Jeff Juden and Marquis Grissom went to Milwaukee. This was the third consecutive year that Villone was traded, but this was the first year in which he was not dealt midway through the year.

He had a better time in Buffalo, going 2–2 with a 2.01 earned run average in 23 appearances. In 22 innings, he gave up 20 hits and walked 11. Apparently, he had more velocity, because he struck out 28 batters. Unfortunately, he could not maintain control in Cleveland, as he walked 22 in 27 innings (25 outings). He also gave up 30 hits, and had an earned run average of 6.00.

On April 2, he was released by the Indians.

Cincinnati Reds
Three days later, the Cincinnati Reds signed him, and he was back in business as a starting pitcher/long reliever. During the 1999 season, he won nine games, lost seven, and had an earned run average of 4.23. He pitched in 29 games (22 starts) pitching 142 innings. One hundred fourteen batters reached base via the hit, while 73 reached courtesy of the base on balls. Even though the strikeouts per nine innings went down (4.91), he proved to be effective.

In , he was not as effective, yet he posted a .500 record (10–10). He walked more batters (78), struck out less (77), allowed more hits (154), and had a higher earned run average (5.43) than the 1999 season.

Colorado Rockies
On November 8, 2000 he was dealt to the Colorado Rockies for Jeff Taglienti and Justin Carter. As a spot starter and long reliever, he went 1–3 with a 6.36 earned run average. In 22 games (6 starts), he pitched 46 innings, allowing 56 hits and 29 walks, and striking out 48.

Houston Astros
June 27,  marked the fifth time that Villone was traded. On this occasion, he was dealt to the Houston Astros for Jay Powell. He continued to struggle, agoing 5–7 with a 5.56 earned run average. He continued to be a spot starter/long reliever on the Astros’ pitching staff. In 68 innings, he gave up 77 hits, but lowered his walk total to 24. and struck out 65 batters. Villone was granted free agency on November 5, 2001.

Pittsburgh Pirates
On February 16, the Pittsburgh Pirates signed him to a one-year contract. With the Pirates, he went 4–6 with a 5.81 earned run average. Over 45 games (seven starts), he pitched 93 innings, allowed 95 hits, 34 walks, and had 55 strikeouts. Villone was granted free agency on October 29, 2002.

Arizona Diamondbacks
Five months later, he signed a minor league contract with the Arizona Diamondbacks. They assigned him to Tucson, their AAA affiliate. While at Tucson, Ron posted a 1–1 record with a 3.55 earned run average. However, they assigned him to pitch exclusively out of the bullpen. In 25 innings, he allowed 20 hits and 12 walks while recording 22 strikeouts. Despite this limited success, he was released on May 15, .

Houston Astros (2nd time)
On May 19, 2003, he returned to the Astros on a one-year deal. He was assigned to AAA New Orleans. A 3–1 record and a 1.23 earned run average in 5 starts (29 innings) earned him a trip to the big leagues, where he went 6–6 with a 4.13 earned run average. All 19 outings with the Astros were starts, amassing 106 innings. He allowed a total of 91 hits and 48 walks, and had 91 strikeouts.

Seattle Mariners (2nd time)
On November 2, 2003, Villone chose to test the free agent market, once again. The Mariners signed him to a one-year contract. Villone had a decent season with them, going 8–6 with a 4.08 earned run average. Again, Villone was used in a long relief/spot starter role, something that he was accustomed to from his days with Houston, Colorado, and Pittsburgh. In 117 innings, Villone gave up 102 hits and 64 walks, while striking out 86. His contract expired at the end of the season, and he declared free agency once again. The Mariners inked him to another one-year deal on December 19, 2004. In the  season, Ron went 2–3 with a 2.45 earned run average. Used primarily as a lefty specialist, he pitched 40 innings, allowing 33 hits, 23 walks, and 41 strikeouts.

Florida Marlins
On July 31, 2005, the Mariners sent Villone to the Florida Marlins in exchange for Yorman Bazardo and Mike Flannery. As a Marlin, Villone pitched in 27 games (23 innings), mostly as a lefty specialist. He gave up 24 hits, 12 walks, and 29 strikeouts. Villone struggled in Florida, posting a 6.85 earned run average with the Marlins.

New York Yankees

On February 13,  he was signed to a minor league deal with the New York Yankees. During spring training in 2007, Ron was given a chance to earn a spot in the Yankee bullpen, but was beat out for the last spot by Sean Henn. However, he was called back up in mid-May.

St. Louis Cardinals
In February  , Villone was signed by the St. Louis Cardinals to a minor league contract and was invited to spring training. Coming out of camp, Villone made the Opening Day roster.

New York Mets
On February 27, 2009, Villone signed a minor league contract with the New York Mets and was invited to spring training. He did not make the team, and was granted his release on March 27.

Washington Nationals
He then signed a minor league deal with the Washington Nationals on April 10 and was assigned to Triple-A Syracuse. On May 7, Villone's contract was purchased from Syracuse. Led the team in appearances in 2009 with 63.  On March 15, 2010, the Washington Nationals released him with a torn quadriceps that he never recovered from.

During a July 23, 2010 game with the Durham Bulls, Villone took the mound in the eighth inning with a one-run lead but gave up a walk to what would become the tying run.  He then threw to first base 12 times to hold the runner, without once throwing to home plate, annoying the crowd who booed Villone mercilessly.  When Villone finally threw to home plate, the batter bunted the ball back to Villone, failed to make the play.  Villone walked the next batter and hit the following batter with a two-strike pitch to force in the tying run.  He was immediately pulled from the game.  Less than a month later, on August 12, 2010, he was once again released after posting an ERA of 6.59 during his time in Triple A. On March 10, 2011 Villone re-signed with the Nationals.

Somerset Patriots
Cut from the Nationals before the regular season started, Villone then signed with the Somerset Patriots of the independent AA Atlantic League.

Postseason
Villone pitched in three postseason games and did not allow an earned run.

Coaching career
He became the pitching coach of the Chicago Cubs' Single-A affiliate, the Peoria Chiefs, in 2012. In December 2012, Villone was announced as the pitching coach for the Cubs' new Single-A affiliate, the Kane County Cougars, where he spent the 2013 season. In December 2013, he was promoted to pitching coach for the Daytona Cubs of the Class A-Advanced Florida State League, where he stayed for several seasons. As of 2021, Villone is pitching coach for the Triple-A Iowa Cubs.

Personal life
Villone is married and resides in Upper Saddle River, New Jersey with his wife, Brooke. He has three children: Megan (born March 26, 1996), Ronald Thomas III (born September 14, 1997) and Sofia Francesca (born June 9, 2010). His wife Brooke appears on the VH1 reality show "Baseball Wives", which premiered in 2011.

See also

 List of Major League Baseball players named in the Mitchell Report

References

External links

1970 births
Living people
Baseball coaches from New Jersey
Baseball players at the 1992 Summer Olympics
Baseball players from New Jersey
Bergenfield High School alumni
Bourne Braves players
Buffalo Bisons (minor league) players
Cincinnati Reds players
Cleveland Indians players
Colorado Rockies players
Florida Marlins players
Houston Astros players
Indianapolis Indians players
Jacksonville Suns players
Las Vegas Stars (baseball) players
Major League Baseball pitchers
Milwaukee Brewers players
New Orleans Zephyrs players
New York Yankees players
Olympic baseball players of the United States
People from Bergenfield, New Jersey
People from Englewood, New Jersey
People from Upper Saddle River, New Jersey
Pittsburgh Pirates players
Riverside Pilots players
San Diego Padres players
Scranton/Wilkes-Barre Yankees players
Seattle Mariners players
Somerset Patriots players
Sportspeople from the New York metropolitan area
St. Louis Cardinals players
Syracuse Chiefs players
Tacoma Rainiers players
Tucson Sidewinders players
UMass Minutemen baseball players
UMass Minutemen football players
Washington Nationals players